Fors can mean:

 Fors, Deux-Sèvres, a French commune in the department of Deux-Sèvres
 Fors (Swedish village), a village in the Avesta Municipality in Dalarna County, Sweden
 Fors (Swedish parish), a parish in the Diocese of Härnösand, Sweden
 FORS, Transport for London's Freight Operator Recognition Scheme
 FORS, a measuring instrument installed on the Very Large Telescope
 FORS (Swiss Centre of Expertise in the Social Sciences)
 Sebastian Fors, a Swedish video game streamer